Wangquan Subdistrict is a subdistrict in the west side of Shunyi District, Beijing, China. It shares border with Shuangfeng Subdistrict to the north, Shengli and Shiyuan Subdistricts to the east, Renhe Town to the south and west, and Nanfaxin Town to the northwest. Its population was 94,415 as of 2020.

The subdistrict was founded in 2007 by merging parts of Shengli Subdistrict, Guangming Subdistrict and Renhe Town.

Administrative divisions 

At the end of 2021, Wangquan Subdistrict had 28 subdivisions, where 20 of them were communities, and 8 of them were villages:

See also 

 List of township-level divisions of Beijing

References 

Shunyi District
Subdistricts of Beijing